The Braille pattern dots-12345 is a 6-dot braille cell with the all top and middle dots and the bottom left dot raised, or an 8-dot braille cell with the top four and lower-middle left dots raised. It is represented by the Unicode code point U+281f, and in Braille ASCII with Q.

Unified Braille

In unified international braille, the braille pattern dots-12345 is used to represent double consonants, such as /kw/ or /kʃ/ or otherwise as needed.

Table of unified braille values

Other braille

Plus dots 7 and 8

Related to Braille pattern dots-12345 are Braille patterns 123457, 123458, and 1234578, which are used in 8-dot braille systems, such as Gardner-Salinas and Luxembourgish Braille.

Related 8-dot kantenji patterns

In the Japanese kantenji braille, the standard 8-dot Braille patterns 23567, 123567, 234567, and 1234567 are the patterns related to Braille pattern dots-12345, since the two additional dots of kantenji patterns 012345, 123457, and 0123457 are placed above the base 6-dot cell, instead of below, as in standard 8-dot braille.

Kantenji using braille patterns 23567, 123567, 234567, or 1234567

This listing includes kantenji using Braille pattern dots-12345 for all 6349 kanji found in JIS C 6226-1978.

  - ⼿

Variants and thematic compounds

  -  selector 4 + て/扌  =  専
  -  selector 4 + selector 4 + て/扌  =  專
  -  selector 5 + て/扌  =  夬
  -  selector 6 + て/扌  =  亭
  -  て/扌 + selector 4  =  抽
  -  て/扌 + selector 5  =  拘
  -  数 + て/扌  =  丁

Compounds of ⼿

  -  う/宀/#3 + て/扌  =  挙
  -  う/宀/#3 + う/宀/#3 + て/扌  =  擧
  -  ね/示 + う/宀/#3 + て/扌  =  襷
  -  selector 1 + う/宀/#3 + て/扌  =  舉
  -  け/犬 + て/扌  =  拳
  -  龸 + て/扌  =  掌
  -  せ/食 + て/扌  =  掣
  -  よ/广 + て/扌  =  摩
  -  心 + て/扌  =  欅
  -  て/扌 + ふ/女 + ゑ/訁  =  拏
  -  て/扌 + り/分 + 囗  =  拿
  -  て/扌 + selector 4 + ぬ/力  =  挈
  -  て/扌 + 龸 + う/宀/#3  =  搴
  -  て/扌 + つ/土 + お/頁  =  摯
  -  て/扌 + 宿 + ま/石  =  擘
  -  て/扌 + き/木 + き/木  =  攀
  -  え/訁 + 宿 + て/扌  =  攣
  -  日 + て/扌  =  拍
  -  す/発 + て/扌  =  拒
  -  ま/石 + て/扌  =  拓
  -  れ/口 + て/扌  =  括
  -  と/戸 + て/扌  =  拷
  -  そ/馬 + て/扌  =  挿
  -  そ/馬 + そ/馬 + て/扌  =  插
  -  つ/土 + て/扌  =  捏
  -  ん/止 + て/扌  =  捗
  -  ぬ/力 + て/扌  =  揃
  -  ふ/女 + て/扌  =  搬
  -  ゐ/幺 + て/扌  =  携
  -  み/耳 + て/扌  =  撮
  -  ね/示 + て/扌  =  擦
  -  め/目 + て/扌  =  攫
  -  て/扌 + め/目  =  払
  -  て/扌 + ゐ/幺  =  扱
  -  て/扌 + け/犬  =  扶
  -  て/扌 + け/犬 + ほ/方  =  捧
  -  て/扌 + 比  =  批
  -  て/扌 + 比 + 日  =  揩
  -  て/扌 + は/辶  =  技
  -  て/扌 + そ/馬  =  抄
  -  て/扌 + さ/阝  =  抑
  -  て/扌 + の/禾  =  投
  -  て/扌 + 宿  =  抗
  -  て/扌 + を/貝  =  折
  -  ひ/辶 + て/扌  =  逝
  -  日 + て/扌 + を/貝  =  晢
  -  に/氵 + て/扌 + を/貝  =  浙
  -  て/扌 + ゑ/訁  =  抜
  -  て/扌 + て/扌 + ゑ/訁  =  拔
  -  て/扌 + た/⽥  =  択
  -  て/扌 + ん/止  =  抵
  -  て/扌 + 日  =  担
  -  て/扌 + へ/⺩  =  拙
  -  て/扌 + ぬ/力  =  招
  -  て/扌 + こ/子  =  拡
  -  て/扌 + 囗  =  拾
  -  て/扌 + し/巿  =  持
  -  て/扌 + に/氵  =  指
  -  て/扌 + ふ/女  =  按
  -  て/扌 + ろ/十  =  振
  -  て/扌 + ほ/方  =  捕
  -  て/扌 + せ/食  =  捨
  -  て/扌 + る/忄  =  捻
  -  て/扌 + り/分  =  掃
  -  て/扌 + 龸  =  授
  -  て/扌 + 火  =  排
  -  て/扌 + と/戸  =  掘
  -  て/扌 + つ/土  =  掛
  -  て/扌 + ち/竹  =  採
  -  て/扌 + す/発  =  探
  -  て/扌 + ま/石 + selector 1  =  拉
  -  て/扌 + ま/石  =  接
  -  て/扌 + ま/石 + り/分  =  撞
  -  て/扌 + き/木  =  控
  -  て/扌 + い/糹/#2  =  推
  -  て/扌 + 心  =  掩
  -  て/扌 + ね/示  =  措
  -  て/扌 + 氷/氵  =  掲
  -  て/扌 + く/艹  =  描
  -  て/扌 + よ/广  =  提
  -  て/扌 + 数  =  揚
  -  て/扌 + ⺼  =  換
  -  て/扌 + ゆ/彳  =  握
  -  て/扌 + む/車  =  揮
  -  て/扌 + 仁/亻  =  援
  -  て/扌 + か/金  =  揺
  -  て/扌 + て/扌 + か/金  =  搖
  -  て/扌 + れ/口  =  損
  -  て/扌 + み/耳  =  摂
  -  て/扌 + て/扌 + み/耳  =  攝
  -  て/扌 + お/頁  =  摘
  -  て/扌 + ら/月  =  撤
  -  て/扌 + ら/月 + 氷/氵  =  撒
  -  て/扌 + な/亻  =  撲
  -  て/扌 + ひ/辶  =  擁
  -  て/扌 + う/宀/#3  =  操
  -  て/扌 + や/疒  =  擬
  -  て/扌 + て/扌 + め/目  =  拂
  -  て/扌 + て/扌 + た/⽥  =  擇
  -  て/扌 + て/扌 + 日  =  擔
  -  て/扌 + て/扌 + こ/子  =  擴
  -  て/扌 + 数 + を/貝  =  扎
  -  て/扌 + 宿 + 仁/亻  =  托
  -  て/扌 + こ/子 + selector 1  =  扛
  -  て/扌 + 宿 + か/金  =  扞
  -  て/扌 + selector 1 + ゑ/訁  =  扠
  -  て/扌 + 宿 + た/⽥  =  扣
  -  て/扌 + selector 1 + ぬ/力  =  扨
  -  て/扌 + 宿 + り/分  =  扮
  -  て/扌 + よ/广 + さ/阝  =  扼
  -  て/扌 + selector 4 + 囗  =  找
  -  て/扌 + へ/⺩ + selector 1  =  抂
  -  て/扌 + 比 + 龸  =  抃
  -  て/扌 + 宿 + ひ/辶  =  把
  -  て/扌 + selector 4 + よ/广  =  抒
  -  て/扌 + ⺼ + つ/土  =  抓
  -  て/扌 + selector 4 + ふ/女  =  抔
  -  て/扌 + 比 + と/戸  =  抖
  -  て/扌 + う/宀/#3 + ぬ/力  =  抛
  -  て/扌 + selector 4 + ひ/辶  =  披
  -  て/扌 + う/宀/#3 + な/亻  =  抬
  -  て/扌 + き/木 + selector 5  =  抹
  -  て/扌 + selector 5 + し/巿  =  抻
  -  て/扌 + selector 1 + を/貝  =  拆
  -  て/扌 + 比 + は/辶  =  拇
  -  て/扌 + れ/口 + と/戸  =  拈
  -  て/扌 + な/亻 + し/巿  =  拊
  -  て/扌 + ろ/十 + は/辶  =  拌
  -  て/扌 + 宿 + ぬ/力  =  拐
  -  て/扌 + selector 4 + る/忄  =  拑
  -  て/扌 + ゐ/幺 + selector 1  =  拗
  -  て/扌 + 宿 + 囗  =  拭
  -  て/扌 + つ/土 + れ/口  =  拮
  -  て/扌 + selector 6 + に/氵  =  拯
  -  て/扌 + selector 4 + こ/子  =  拱
  -  て/扌 + ろ/十 + こ/子  =  拵
  -  て/扌 + 宿 + つ/土  =  挂
  -  て/扌 + す/発 + れ/口  =  挌
  -  て/扌 + 数 + 宿  =  挑
  -  て/扌 + 宿 + な/亻  =  挟
  -  て/扌 + む/車 + selector 2  =  挧
  -  て/扌 + よ/广 + 仁/亻  =  挫
  -  て/扌 + は/辶 + へ/⺩  =  挺
  -  て/扌 + 宿 + 宿  =  挽
  -  て/扌 + selector 5 + な/亻  =  挾
  -  て/扌 + み/耳 + selector 2  =  捉
  -  て/扌 + れ/口 + ね/示  =  捌
  -  て/扌 + selector 4 + か/金  =  捍
  -  て/扌 + 宿 + ら/月  =  捐
  -  て/扌 + と/戸 + け/犬  =  捩
  -  て/扌 + 宿 + も/門  =  捫
  -  て/扌 + と/戸 + selector 1  =  据
  -  て/扌 + け/犬 + さ/阝  =  捲
  -  て/扌 + 宿 + に/氵  =  捶
  -  て/扌 + ら/月 + か/金  =  捷
  -  て/扌 + け/犬 + 仁/亻  =  捺
  -  て/扌 + ん/止 + を/貝  =  掀
  -  て/扌 + 日 + と/戸  =  掉
  -  て/扌 + け/犬 + か/金  =  掎
  -  て/扌 + 宿 + と/戸  =  掏
  -  て/扌 + 龸 + な/亻  =  掖
  -  て/扌 + う/宀/#3 + よ/广  =  掟
  -  て/扌 + 龸 + れ/口  =  掠
  -  て/扌 + み/耳 + ゑ/訁  =  掫
  -  て/扌 + 心 + selector 2  =  掬
  -  て/扌 + 囗 + へ/⺩  =  掴
  -  て/扌 + り/分 + さ/阝  =  掵
  -  て/扌 + 宿 + む/車  =  掻
  -  て/扌 + 宿 + そ/馬  =  掾
  -  て/扌 + 比 + ひ/辶  =  揀
  -  て/扌 + 宿 + ゆ/彳  =  揄
  -  て/扌 + 数 + す/発  =  揆
  -  て/扌 + き/木 + よ/广  =  揉
  -  て/扌 + 宿 + れ/口  =  揖
  -  て/扌 + 宿 + の/禾  =  揣
  -  て/扌 + み/耳 + さ/阝  =  揶
  -  て/扌 + 龸 + む/車  =  搆
  -  て/扌 + 宿 + は/辶  =  搏
  -  て/扌 + そ/馬 + こ/子  =  搓
  -  て/扌 + せ/食 + や/疒  =  搗
  -  て/扌 + ゆ/彳 + ゆ/彳  =  搦
  -  て/扌 + 宿 + 日  =  搨
  -  て/扌 + と/戸 + 宿  =  搭
  -  て/扌 + り/分 + お/頁  =  搶
  -  て/扌 + う/宀/#3 + う/宀/#3  =  摎
  -  て/扌 + 宿 + い/糹/#2  =  摧
  -  て/扌 + 宿 + く/艹  =  摸
  -  て/扌 + む/車 + 日  =  摺
  -  て/扌 + 龸 + ぬ/力  =  撈
  -  て/扌 + 宿 + 龸  =  撓
  -  て/扌 + 宿 + を/貝  =  撕
  -  て/扌 + け/犬 + 火  =  撚
  -  て/扌 + 宿 + す/発  =  撥
  -  て/扌 + 宿 + ろ/十  =  撩
  -  て/扌 + む/車 + 火  =  撫
  -  て/扌 + の/禾 + た/⽥  =  播
  -  て/扌 + 宿 + こ/子  =  撰
  -  て/扌 + 龸 + め/目  =  撹
  -  て/扌 + ひ/辶 + た/⽥  =  撻
  -  て/扌 + ひ/辶 + 心  =  撼
  -  て/扌 + ち/竹 + た/⽥  =  擂
  -  て/扌 + 囗 + れ/口  =  擅
  -  て/扌 + 宿 + き/木  =  擒
  -  て/扌 + さ/阝 + 龸  =  擠
  -  て/扌 + selector 4 + な/亻  =  擡
  -  て/扌 + 宿 + や/疒  =  擢
  -  て/扌 + へ/⺩ + し/巿  =  擣
  -  て/扌 + う/宀/#3 + を/貝  =  擯
  -  て/扌 + も/門 + す/発  =  擱
  -  て/扌 + 宿 + さ/阝  =  擲
  -  て/扌 + 宿 + ち/竹  =  擶
  -  て/扌 + す/発 + ら/月  =  擺
  -  て/扌 + 日 + ゐ/幺  =  擽
  -  て/扌 + selector 1 + ゆ/彳  =  擾
  -  て/扌 + を/貝 + け/犬  =  攅
  -  て/扌 + 宿 + み/耳  =  攘
  -  て/扌 + や/疒 + selector 1  =  攜
  -  て/扌 + く/艹 + い/糹/#2  =  攤
  -  て/扌 + 宿 + め/目  =  攪
  -  て/扌 + め/目 + す/発  =  攬
  -  ち/竹 + 宿 + て/扌  =  箍

Compounds of 専 and 專

  -  ろ/十 + て/扌  =  博
  -  selector 1 + ろ/十 + て/扌  =  愽
  -  ち/竹 + て/扌  =  簿
  -  い/糹/#2 + て/扌  =  縛
  -  く/艹 + て/扌  =  薄
  -  て/扌 + selector 4 + て/扌  =  摶
  -  心 + selector 4 + て/扌  =  榑
  -  き/木 + selector 4 + て/扌  =  槫
  -  に/氵 + selector 4 + て/扌  =  溥
  -  か/金 + selector 4 + て/扌  =  甎
  -  ま/石 + selector 4 + て/扌  =  磚
  -  を/貝 + selector 4 + て/扌  =  賻
  -  な/亻 + 宿 + て/扌  =  傅
  -  な/亻 + な/亻 + て/扌  =  傳
  -  む/車 + む/車 + て/扌  =  轉
  -  れ/口 + む/車 + て/扌  =  囀
  -  る/忄 + 宿 + て/扌  =  慱
  -  ⺼ + 宿 + て/扌  =  膊
  -  心 + う/宀/#3 + て/扌  =  蓴

Compounds of 夬

  -  る/忄 + て/扌  =  快
  -  に/氵 + て/扌  =  決
  -  に/氵 + に/氵 + て/扌  =  决
  -  ゑ/訁 + て/扌  =  訣
  -  ぬ/力 + 宿 + て/扌  =  刔
  -  て/扌 + 宿 + て/扌  =  抉
  -  ね/示 + 宿 + て/扌  =  袂
  -  て/扌 + 宿 + せ/食  =  鴃

Compounds of 亭

  -  仁/亻 + て/扌  =  停
  -  に/氵 + selector 6 + て/扌  =  渟

Compounds of 抽

  -  て/扌 + え/訁  =  捜
  -  て/扌 + て/扌 + え/訁  =  搜
  -  こ/子 + て/扌  =  押

Compounds of 拘

  -  て/扌 + も/門  =  抱

Compounds of 丁

  -  て/扌 + て/扌  =  打
  -  宿 + て/扌  =  寧
  -  れ/口 + 宿 + て/扌  =  嚀
  -  心 + 宿 + て/扌  =  檸
  -  に/氵 + 宿 + て/扌  =  濘
  -  け/犬 + 宿 + て/扌  =  獰
  -  み/耳 + 宿 + て/扌  =  聹
  -  火 + て/扌  =  灯
  -  た/⽥ + て/扌  =  町
  -  え/訁 + て/扌  =  訂
  -  を/貝 + て/扌  =  貯
  -  か/金 + て/扌  =  釘
  -  お/頁 + て/扌  =  頂
  -  れ/口 + 数 + て/扌  =  叮
  -  に/氵 + 数 + て/扌  =  汀
  -  た/⽥ + 数 + て/扌  =  甼
  -  や/疒 + 数 + て/扌  =  疔
  -  ま/石 + 数 + て/扌  =  竚
  -  い/糹/#2 + 数 + て/扌  =  紵
  -  心 + 数 + て/扌  =  苧
  -  せ/食 + 数 + て/扌  =  酊
  -  仁/亻 + 宿 + て/扌  =  佇

Other compounds

  -  囗 + て/扌  =  団
  -  囗 + 囗 + て/扌  =  團
  -  な/亻 + て/扌  =  伝
  -  む/車 + て/扌  =  転
  -  や/疒 + お/頁 + て/扌  =  巓
  -  て/扌 + の/禾 + selector 4  =  秉
  -  さ/阝 + 宿 + て/扌  =  鄭

Notes

Braille patterns